Nordrach is a municipality in the district of Ortenau in Baden-Württemberg in Germany.  Nearly 80% of its area is forested, part of the Black Forest.

Dr. Otto Walther and his wife, Dr. Hope Adams, founded a hospital for treatment of tuberculosis nearby, the Nordrach Clinic, in the late 19th century.   She was the first woman in Germany to be granted a licence to practice as a doctor.

References

Ortenaukreis